Hilary Knight may refer to:

Hilary Knight (illustrator) (born 1926), American writer and artist, best known as the illustrator of Eloise
Hilary Knight (ice hockey) (born 1989), American ice hockey forward